WebORB is an integration server developed and maintained by Midnight Coders Incorporated.  It is used in SOA/Rich Internet Application development projects to connect browser clients (Adobe Flex, Adobe Flash, AJAX, Java, .NET, Silverlight, JSON) and mobile clients (Android, Windows Phone 7, BlackBerry PlayBook) with backend services (.NET, Java, PHP and Ruby on Rails) and databases (MySQL, Microsoft SQL Server, SQL Azure, PostgreSQL, ODBC and Oracle database).  It combines technologies that provide developer productivity tools, AMF remoting, real time messaging, code-level security and real time streaming media.

Midnight Coders positions WebORB as a full-featured platform that has been shown to reduce the complexity of multitier architecture integration, thus speeding the development process and time to market. (See Case Studies.) There are four WebORB versions - WebORB for .NET, WebORB for Java, WebORB for PHP and WebORB for Rails.  WebORB PDF Generator is a product that plugs into WebORB for .NET and WebORB for Java to provide server-side PDF generation.

Features 
Developer Productivity Tools -used to improve workflow processes, resulting in better utilization of developer time.  WebORB's developer productivity tools consist of:

 Service Browser - enables developers to view services in a single unified interface that encapsulates service browsing, code generation, invocation test drive and graphical security configurator.
 Code Generators - automate the creation of repeatable blocks of code.  WebORB supports code generators for ActionScript, Cairngorm, PureMVC, Mate, Swiz, JavaScript, AJAX, Silverlight and custom code generators.
 Invocation Test Drive - enables client- and server-side developers to test integration on demand.
 Security - enables developers to decouple security from the application logic and shift security to a container (WebORB), where the application and its services are hosted.
 Data Management - consists of a data modeler, code generator, sample test application builder and runtime engine that supports real-time client synchronization and transaction processing.

AMF Remoting - a binary protocol used to improve application performance through a more streamline communication path for interprocess communication (client-to-server, server-to-server, client-to-client and server-to-client).  (See AMF vs Web Services.)

Messaging/Streaming - supports Real Time Messaging Protocol (RTMP) for chat messaging and video/audio streaming, as well as, publish/subscribe and data push.

Midnight Coders released WebORB for .NET version 4.X recently, which can be run in the Microsoft Azure Cloud and supports expanding and contracting on cloud computing resources based on user volume.

Midnight Coders announced in February 2011 an integration with Sapphire Steel's Amethyst IDE, which runs inside Visual Studio. This integration was reviewed by Visual Studio Magazine.

References 

Enterprise application integration
Message-oriented middleware
Service-oriented architecture-related products
Java enterprise platform
Adobe Flex
Adobe Flash
Android (operating system) development software
BlackBerry development software
Web development software